István Küzmics (also known in Slovene as Štefan or Števan Küzmič, c.1723 – December 22, 1779) was the most important Lutheran writer of the Slovenes in Hungary.

He was born at Strukovci, in the Prekmurje region of what was then Vas County, in the Kingdom of Hungary (now in Slovenia). His father György Küzmics (1703–1769) was a tailor. From 1733 to 1747 he went to school in Sopron and in Győr, and studied at the lyceum in Pozsony (now Bratislava).  He later became a pastor and teacher in the Slovene-speaking towns of  Nemescsó (1751–1755) and Surd (1755–1779), in what is now Zala County, but was then part of Somogy, an area where many Slovene families settled in the 17th and 18th centuries. He also wrote catechisms and schoolbooks, and he translated the New Testament into Prekmurje Slovene. The translated text, Nouvi zakon ali testamentom, was published in the German town of Halle in 1771.  He died at Surd.

Works 
 Male szlovenszki katekizmus, 1752 (Little Slovene Catechism)
 ABC kni'snicza, 1753 (Primer)
 Vöre Krsztsanske krátki Návuk csiszte rejcsi Bo'ze vözebráni i na nyou, 1754 (Brief Doctrine of the Christian Religion)
 Nouvi Zákon ali Testamentom Gospodna nasega Jezusa Krisztusa zdaj oprvics zGrcskoga na sztári szlovenszki jezik obrnyeni po Stevan Küzmicsi Surdanszkom. F., 1771 (New Testament)

See also
Slovenes in Somogy
Hungarian Slovenes
Prekmurje
Mihály Bakos
List of Slovene writers and poets in Hungary
Primož Trubar

References

 Mária Mukics: Changing World – The Hungarian Slovenes (Változó Világ – A magyarországi szlovének) Press Publica ISSN 1219-5235

Slovenian writers and poets in Hungary
Hungarian translators
Slovenian Lutheran clergy
Hungarian Lutheran clergy
1723 births
1779 deaths
People from the Municipality of Puconci
18th-century translators